Hyomin is a South Korean singer-songwriter and rapper. Her discography currently consists of 3 extended plays, 10 singles and 5 soundtrack appearances (including live tracks).

Although her official debut was as a member of girl group T-ara in 2009, she participated in other projects with her labelmates and appeared on stage for the first time in 2008 with Seeya for the single "Gani".

Hyomin made her official solo debut in May 2014 with "Nice Body" from her first EP Make Up. The EP also marked her debut as a song-writer.

Extended plays

Singles

As lead artist

As featured artist

Soundtrack appearances

Other appearances

Songwriting credits

References 

Hyomin